Uma Kant Yadav is an Indian politician and a member of Bihar Legislative Assembly of India. Yadav was elected in 2003 by polls to fill the vacancy due to the death of Deo Narayan Yadav. He was again elected in 2010 as a member of Rashtriya Janata Dal from the Babubarhi constituency in the Madhubani district of Bihar.

References

Living people
Rashtriya Janata Dal politicians
Bihar MLAs 2010–2015
People from Madhubani district
Bihar MLAs 2000–2005
Year of birth missing (living people)